The 2003 season is the 52nd year in Guangzhou Football Club's existence, their 38th season in the Chinese football league and the 12th season in the professional football league.

First-team squad

Players

2003
Guangzhou Apollo